Pentarthrini is a true weevil tribe in the subfamily Cossoninae.

Genera 
Adel - Agastegnus - Agitonischius - Camptoscapus - Choerorrhinodes - Conisius - Conlonia - Cossonideus - Eucossonus - Euophryum - Geopentarthrum - Gitonischius - Hypopentarthrum - Leptomimus - Leptommatus - Lyprodes - Macroscytalus - Mesoxenomorphus - Microcossonus - Microtrupis - Morronella - Myrmecorhinus - Neoproconus - Nepalorhynchus - Orothreptes - Pacindonus - Pentarthrocis - Pentarthrum - Proconus - Promicrocossonus - Rhinanisodes - Sphinctocephalus - Stenopentarthrum - Stenotrupis - Tanysoma - Temnorrhamphus - Terminus - Torostoma - Touropsis - Trapezirrhynchus - Tychiodes - Tychiosoma - Xenosomatium - Zenoteratus

References

External links 

 bugguide.net

Cossoninae